Lir Abi or Lirabi may refer to:
 Lir Abi, Ardal
 Lir Abi, Lordegan